Zohra Bensalem (born April 5, 1990, in Béjaïa) is an Algerian international volleyball player.  She competed for Algeria at the 2012 Summer Olympics.

Club information
Current club :  GSP (ex MC Alger)
Debut club :  ASW Bejaia

References

Living people
1990 births
Volleyball players from Béjaïa
Olympic volleyball players of Algeria
Volleyball players at the 2012 Summer Olympics
Competitors at the 2009 Mediterranean Games
Algerian women's volleyball players
Mediterranean Games competitors for Algeria
21st-century Algerian women
Competitors at the 2022 Mediterranean Games
20th-century Algerian women